HMS Pasley was an  built on the Tyne by Swan Hunter & Wigham Richardson for the Royal Navy and launched on 15 April 1916. She saw service during the First World War.

Description
The Admiralty M class were improved and faster versions of the preceding . They displaced . They were powered by three Parsons direct-drive steam turbines, each driving one propeller shaft, using steam provided by four Yarrow boilers. The ships' complement was 76 officers and ratings.

The ships were armed with three single QF  Mark IV guns and two QF 2-pounder (40 mm) "pom-pom" anti-aircraft guns. The ships were also fitted with two above water twin mounts for  torpedoes.

Construction
Pasley was one of 16 Admiralty M-class destroyers ordered as part of the Fourth War Construction Programme in February 1915. She was laid down at Swan Hunter's Wallsend shipyard in July 1915, launched on 15 April 1916 and completed in July 1916.

Service history
On commissioning, Pasley joined the Thirteenth Destroyer Flotilla, part of the Grand Fleet. On 18 August 1916, the German High Seas Fleet launched an attempt to draw out and destroy a section of the British Fleet. The British were aware of the German plan owing to radio intercepts, and the Grand Fleet set out to engage the German force, with the Thirteenth Destroyer Flotilla sailing with the Battlecruiser Force. No engagement between the opposing fleets occurred, but during the return voyage, at about 16:45 on 19 August, the light cruiser  was torpedoed twice by the German submarine . Falmouth, escorted by the three destroyers, limped homeward under her own power, with the escort being reinforced by four more destroyers from the Fourth Destroyer Flotilla at about 23:00, with two tugs arriving from Immingham early on 20 August. The force had almost reached safety when the submarine  hit Falmouth with two more torpedoes. Falmouth eventually sank about 5 miles off Flamborough Head.

Sinking of G9
 
Pasley stopped to pick up survivors, but only one member of G9s crew was saved, after Able Seaman Henry Old jumped from the destroyer into the sea to attach a running bowline around him, enabling him to be hauled aboard.

Pasley suffered extensive but not critical damage to her bows, and was able to continue her voyage to Lerwick; she was later repaired and returned to the fleet. At the Court of Inquiry held four days after the incident aboard  at Scapa, it was decided no blame could be attached to Pasley, concluding "that the process of reasoning which led the captain of HM Submarine G9 to mistake HMS Pasley for a U-boat is, and must remain, unexplained".

Their Lords Commissioners of the Admiralty later directed the captain of Pasley, Commander Charles Gordon Ramsey, to inform the Officer of the Watch at the time of the incident, Midshipman Wallis, that in the opinion of the Court of Inquiry the action taken by him "was the right action to take under the circumstances, and that its result, so deeply to be regretted, is evidence that it was taken with commendable promptness and precision....". Commander Ramsey later rose to the rank of admiral; he retired in 1942, and was appointed aide de camp to King George VI.  His portrait by Bassano is held by the National Portrait Gallery, London.

Final years
In November 1917, Pasley transferred to the Fourth Destroyer Flotilla, based at Devonport; she was sold for scrap on 9 May 1921.

References

Bibliography
 
 
 
 
 
 
 

 

Admiralty M-class destroyers
Ships built by Swan Hunter
1916 ships
World War I destroyers of the United Kingdom
Maritime incidents in 1917